The canton of Yssingeaux is an administrative division of the Haute-Loire department, south-central France. Its borders were not modified at the French canton reorganisation which came into effect in March 2015. Its seat is in Yssingeaux.

It consists of the following communes:
Araules
Beaux
Bessamorel
Grazac
Lapte
Saint-Julien-du-Pinet
Yssingeaux

References

Cantons of Haute-Loire